The 2022 Louisville Cardinals men's soccer team represented the University of Louisville during the 2022 NCAA Division I men's soccer season.  The Cardinals were led by head coach John Michael Hayden, in his fourth season.  They played their home games at Lynn Stadium.  This was the team's 44th season playing organized men's college soccer and their 9th playing in the Atlantic Coast Conference.

The Cardinals finished the season 9–6–3 overall and 4–3–1 in ACC play to finish in third place in the Atlantic Division. As the fifth overall seed in the ACC Tournament they were upset by twelfth seed Virginia Tech in the First Round.

Background

The Cardinals finished the season 10–7–1 overall and 5–3–0 in ACC play to finish in second place in the Atlantic Division.  As the fourth overall seed in the ACC Tournament the received a bye into the Quarterfinals, where they lost against fifth seed Notre Dame.  They received an at-large bid to the NCAA Tournament where they lost in the First Round to Bowling Green to end their season.

Player movement

Players leaving

Players arriving

Recruiting Class

Squad

Roster

Team management

Source:

Schedule

Source:

|-
!colspan=6 style=""| Regular Season

|-
!colspan=6 style=""| ACC Tournament

|-
!colspan=6 style=""| NCAA Tournament

Awards and honors

Rankings

References

2022
Louisville Cardinals
Louisville Cardinals
Louisville Cardinals men's soccer